Luis Bru Masipó (13 August 1892 – 23 May 1972), born Lluís, was a Spanish footballer who played as a goalkeeper for FC Barcelona. He was the first goalkeeper in Spain to play "the English style", which consisted of blocking the ball instead of kicking the ball away.

Club career
Born in Catalonia, he began his career in 1909 in a non-federated team. In 1910, he joined International FC, initially playing as a left midfielder until 1912, when in a match where the goalkeeper was missing, he occupied this position on the pitch, and his performance was so impressive that from then on he always played as a goalkeeper. In 1913 he signed for RCD Espanyol, but his spell at the club was cut short as Barcelona signed him at the end of the year, making his debut on on 7 December 1913. In first season at the club, he ousted the great Luís Reñé. He played for Barça for nearly a decade (1913–22), playing a total of 219 matches, serving as the team captain, and helping the club win 2 Catalan championships in 1915–16 and 1918–19, and to reach the 1919 Copa del Rey Final, in which he conceded 5 goals in a 2–5 loss to Arenas Club.

One of his most remembered performances was during the semi-finals of the 1916 Copa del Rey between Barcelona and Madrid FC, which ended in a remarkable six-goal tie, but Barça was punished with three penalties, of which Bru saved two. In 1919, with the arrival of Ricardo Zamora at the club, Bru lost his place in the starting line-up, and so, on 19 October 1919, he was the subject of a tribute match along with Eduardo Reguera, which took place at the Camp de la Indústria between Barça and FC Espanya, ending in a 2–2 draw.

International career
Like many other FC Barcelona players of that time, Bru was summoned to play for the Catalan national team several times between 1913 and 1916. In May 1915, he was a member of the Catalan team that participated in the first edition of the Prince of Asturias Cup in 1915, an inter-regional competition organized by the RFEF.

Retirement
In 1929 a tribute festival was held in honor of Luis Bru, who was suffering from a serious illness, with several athletic tests and a football match in which Barcelona beat a Catalan team by 2 to 1.

Honours
Barcelona
Catalan championship:
Champions (1): 1915–16 and 1918–19

Copa del Rey:
Runner-up (1): 1919

International
Catalonia
Prince of Asturias Cup:
Runner-up (1): 1915

References

1892 births
1972 deaths
Footballers from Barcelona
Spanish footballers
Association football goalkeepers
RCD Espanyol footballers
FC Barcelona players
Catalonia international footballers